The leg press is a compound weight training exercise in which the individual pushes a weight or resistance away from them using their legs. The term leg press machine refers to the apparatus used to perform this exercise. The leg press can be used to evaluate an athlete's overall lower body strength (from the gluteus Maximus to the lower leg muscles). It can help to build squat strength. If performed correctly, the inclined leg press can help develop knees to manage heavier free weights, on the other hand, it has the potential to inflict grave injury: the knees could bend the wrong way if they are locked during the exercise.

It can be performed in variations, for example with one leg, or attaching bands to the leg press.

Types 

There are two main types of leg press:
 The diagonal (incline) or vertical 'sled' type leg press. Weight plates are attached directly to the sled, which is mounted on rails. The user sits below the sled and pushes it upward with their feet. These machines normally include adjustable safety brackets that prevent the user from being trapped under the weight. 
 The 'cable' type leg press, or 'seated leg press', commonly found on multigyms. The user sits upright and pushes forward with their feet onto a plate that is attached to the weight stack by means of a long steel cable.

Muscle groups 
The leg press works the following muscle groups:
Quadriceps
Hamstring
Gluteus maximus
Calves (partially)
Varying the angle between the sled and the backrest and/or the position of the feet on the plate puts more emphasis on one or the other muscle group.

Magnitude of leg press lifts 

As the diagonal leg press involves pushing a weight along an inclined track, rather than lifting it vertically, it is possible for strength trainers to press very heavy weight in comparison to other exercises.

Variations

One-legged 
The leg press can be performed with one leg only. This can help to build stabilising muscles. It is sometimes considered to be a more 'functional' exercise than the two-legged bilateral leg press because it can better replicate sporting or athletic movements where one leg is primarily being employed. According to the NFL quarterback Colin Kaepernick, 'I like single-leg work because it isn't often as a quarterback that both of your feet are stationary and planted.' Performing the exercise one-legged may also help to correct strength imbalances between the legs. This is because during a bilateral two-legged leg press one side may be excessively dominant. Working both legs alternatively in a single-legged fashion means each leg has to perform the same amount of work.

Standing 
A standing leg press is a one-legged variation which is performed with one foot on the floor and the other positioned ahead of the person on a wall. Keeping one foot on the floor, the person bends their leg and moves towards the wall, and then straightens their leg and moves away from the wall etc. Alternatively an unfixed sled or cable pulley machine can be used to provide resistance against which the person pushes against.

See also 
Exercise
Exercise physiology

References 

 Análise anatômica e eletromiográfica dos exercícios de leg press, agachamento e stiff

Weight training exercises
Weight training equipment